Communauté d'agglomération de Chaumont is the communauté d'agglomération, an intercommunal structure, centred on the town of Chaumont. It is located in the Haute-Marne department, in the Grand Est region, northeastern France. Created in 2017, its seat is in Chaumont. Its area is 927.0 km2. Its population was 44,441 in 2019, of which 21,847 in Chaumont proper.

Composition
The communauté d'agglomération consists of the following 63 communes:

Ageville
Annéville-la-Prairie
Biesles
Blaisy
Bologne
Brethenay
Briaucourt
Buxières-lès-Villiers
Cerisières
Chamarandes-Choignes
Chaumont
Colombey-les-Deux-Églises
Condes
Curmont
Cuves
Daillancourt
Esnouveaux
Euffigneix
Forcey
Foulain
Froncles
La Genevroye
Gillancourt
Guindrecourt-sur-Blaise
Jonchery
Juzennecourt
Lachapelle-en-Blaisy
Lamancine
Lanques-sur-Rognon
Laville-aux-Bois
Louvières
Luzy-sur-Marne
Mandres-la-Côte
Marbéville
Marnay-sur-Marne
Meures
Mirbel
Neuilly-sur-Suize
Ninville
Nogent
Ormoy-lès-Sexfontaines
Oudincourt
Poinson-lès-Nogent
Poulangy
Rennepont
Riaucourt
Rizaucourt-Buchey
Rochefort-sur-la-Côte
Rouécourt
Sarcey
Semoutiers-Montsaon
Sexfontaines
Soncourt-sur-Marne
Thivet
Treix
Verbiesles
Vesaignes-sur-Marne
Viéville
Vignory
Villiers-le-Sec
Vitry-lès-Nogent
Vouécourt
Vraincourt

References

Chaumont
Chaumont